Ålandsk Ungcenter ("Ålandic Young Center"), or just Ungcenter, is a political youth organisation of the Åland Centre party. It was founded in 1977.

The organisation is a member of the Nordic Center Youth. It's also represented in the Nordic Youth Council.

Sources 

Youth wings of political parties in Finland
Politics of Åland
Organizations established in 1977